Ernest Constantine, Landgrave of Hesse-Philippsthal (8 August 1771 in Philippsthal – 25 December 1849 in Meiningen) was a member of the House of Hesse and Landgrave of Hesse-Philippsthal from 1816 until his death.

Life 
Ernest Constantine was the youngest son of the Landgrave William of Hesse-Philippsthal (1726-1810) from his marriage with Ulrike Eleonora of Hesse-Philippsthal-Barchfeld (1732-1795), daughter of William, Landgrave of Hesse-Philippsthal-Barchfeld.

Until 1796 he was an officer in Dutch service.  In 1797, he acquired the porcelain manufactory in Volkstedt (a suburb of Rudolstadt), which he sold two years later.

In 1808 he became Grand Chamberlain of the Jérôme Bonaparte, the King of Westphalia.  After the dissolution of the kingdom of Westphalia, Ernst Constantine succeeded his brother Louis as Landgrave of Hesse-Philippsthal in 1816.  He also re-entered Dutch service, where he was appointed general.

Marriage and issue 
Ernest Constantine married Louise (1775-1808), the daughter of Prince Frederick Charles of Schwarzburg-Rudolstadt (1736-1793), on 10 April 1796 in Rudolstadt, with whom he had the five children:
 Frederick William (1797-1797)
 Ferdinand (1799-1837)
 George Gustav (1801-1802)
Charles II (1803-1868), who succeeded him as Landgrave of Hesse-Philippsthal, married the Duchess Marie of Württemberg (1818-1888) in 1845 
 Francis (1805-1861), created Baron of Falkener in 1841, married (morganatically) Mary Catharine Kohlmann (1819-1904)
Later, he married his niece, Caroline of Hesse-Philippsthal (1793-1872), daughter of his elder brother Prince Charles of Hesse-Philippsthal, on 17 February 1812 in Kassel. From his second marriage he had two children:
 Victoria (1812-1837)
 William Edward (1817-1819)

Ancestors

References 

 Johann Samuel Ersch: Allgemeine Encyclopädie der Wissenschaften und Künste in alphabetischer ... p. 297 f.
 Otto Wigand: Wigand's Conversations-lexikon p. 633
 Genealogisches Staats-Handbuch p. 93

Landgraves of Hesse
House of Hesse
1771 births
1849 deaths
18th-century German people